Anderssonoceratidae is an extinct family of cephalopods belonging to the Ammonite subclass in the order Ceratitida.

References 

 The Paleobiology Database Accessed on 9/24/07

Otoceratina
Ceratitida families